Charles Dunbar Sharon (born April 4, 1983) is a former American football wide receiver who played for the Jacksonville Jaguars of the National Football League. He was originally signed by the Jaguars as an undrafted free agent in 2006. He played college football at the Bowling Green.

Early years
Sharon attended Palatka High School in Palatka, Florida and was a letterman in football, basketball, and track and field. In football, as a senior, he made 25 receptions for 600 yards (24.0 yards per reception avg.), and was a second-team All-State selection. In track & field, he set the school record in the triple jump with a jump of 47 feet and 7 inches. Charles Sharon graduated from Palatka High School in 2001.

External links
Bowling Green Falcons bio
Jacksonville Jaguars bio

Further reading

1983 births
Living people
People from Palatka, Florida
American football wide receivers
Bowling Green Falcons football players
Jacksonville Jaguars players